Mazeh may refer to:
 Mazeh Gargasht
 Mazeh Kaz
 Mazeh Pariyab
 Mazeh Qola
 Mazeh Sarvemam Qoli
 Mazeh-ye Sardasht